Kihara may refer to:

Kihara (surname)
Kihara, Kenya, settlement in Kenya
, a scientist family in A Certain Magical Index novel series and its derived works.
4795 Kihara
Kihara Aikido, martial art